Telefilm Canada is a Crown corporation reporting to Canada's federal government through the Minister of Canadian Heritage. Headquartered in Montreal, Telefilm provides services to the Canadian audiovisual industry with four regional offices in Vancouver, British Columbia; Toronto, Ontario; Montreal, Quebec; and Halifax, Nova Scotia. The primary mandate of the corporation is to finance and promote Canadian productions through its various funds and programs.

Purpose
As one of the Canadian government's principal instruments for supporting Canada's audiovisual industry, Telefilm Canada's primary mandate is to finance and promote through its various funds and programs. Telefilm's role is to foster the commercial, cultural, and industrial success of Canadian productions and to stimulate demand for those productions both at home and abroad.
Telefilm also administers the programs of the Canada Media Fund.

Coproductions
Telefilm Canada administers the Canadian government's coproductions, enabling Canadian filmmakers and their international counterparts to coproduce films and television programs that enjoy the status of national productions in each of the respective countries.

Operations
Headquartered in Montreal, Telefilm provides bilingual services to its clients through four offices located in Vancouver, Toronto, Montreal and Halifax.

The Atlantic Regional office, in operation since 1984 from Halifax, services New Brunswick, Newfoundland, Nova Scotia and Prince Edward Island.

The Quebec Regional office is located in the Montreal head office and serves the province of Quebec.

The Ontario Regional office, in operation since 1968 from Toronto, serves both Ontario and Nunavut.

The Western Regional office, in operation since 1984 from Vancouver, serves the Western provinces of British Columbia, Alberta, Manitoba, Saskatchewan, the Northwest Territories and the Yukon.

History

Creation

In 1967, the Canadian government founded the Canadian Film Development Corporation (CFDC), allocating $10 million in support of the country's feature film industry. Michael Spencer (1919-2016) was named the first executive director of the CFDC, which by then included offices in Montreal and Toronto.

1970s
By 1976, the Canadian government had increased the CFDC's budget to $25 million annually, at which point it decided to finance the corporation with an annual parliamentary appropriation. Spencer was replaced by Michael McCabe in May 1978. Notable films produced with the agency's support included Goin' Down the Road (1970), The Apprenticeship of Duddy Kravitz (1974), Shivers (1975), Why Shoot the Teacher (1977), In Praise of Older Women (1978).

1980s
The early 1980s sees the CFDC's budget increased yet again and the creation of the Canadian Broadcast Program Development Fund to revitalize Canadian television programming. At the time, approximately 85% of all prime time programming on Canadian television is imported from other countries—namely the US.
Under the direction of André Lamy, in 1984 the CFDC is renamed “Telefilm Canada” to better reflect the organization's full range of activities in both the film and television industries.

With the creation of the Feature Film Fund aimed at supporting feature films by Canadian filmmakers and the Feature Film Distribution Fund that makes credit lines available to Canadian distributors, Telefilm Canada takes a central role in the development and growth of Canadian cinema around the world.

1990s
Now under the executive direction of François Macerola, the Canada Television and Cable Production Fund is created. The Fund is a private-public partnership between the federal government of Canada and the cable and satellite television industry, with Telefilm administering the Equity Investment component of the Fund.
By the end of the 1990s, in 1998, Telefilm Canada creates a five-year, $30-million multimedia fund, aptly-named The Multimedia Fund, with which to support Canadian work in the digital age. The Fund helps Canadians in multimedia to compete effectively in the new technologies arena.

2000s
With the new millennium, the Canadian government implemented a new Canadian Feature Film Policy, From Script to Screen, that effectively created the Canada Feature Film Fund (CFFF) to be managed by Telefilm Canada.

Beginning April 1, 2001, with an annual budget of $100-million, the CFF's primary objective is to build larger audiences in Canada and abroad for Canadian feature films with improved distribution and marketing.
Also that year, Telefilm Canada announces guidelines for the Canada New Media Fund, replacing the Multimedia Fund. Budgets grow from $6 million, to $9 million, and now sit at $14 million annually. 
The latter half of the decade brings about other changes for Telefilm.

In 2005, the Minister of Canadian Heritage announces a new collaboration between the organization and the Canadian Television Fund and, with it, renewed funding of $100 million for Canadian television programming. While the Board of the Canadian Television is responsible for the governance of all programs, Telefilm heads up the administration and delivery of the CTF programs.

Present
The 2012 Canadian federal budget cut funding for the National Film Board of Canada and Telefilm Canada by 10%. Today, following a new four-year plan, Telefilm has made stimulating demand for Canadian screen-based content one of its top priorities.

In April 2022, Christa Dickenson announced that she would step down as executive director and CEO effective September 9, 2022.

Key people

Executive directors
Michael Spencer – March 1969 to April 1978
Michael McCabe – May 1978 to April 1980
Pierre Thibault – April to July 1980, acting executive director
André Lamy – August 1980 to June 1985
Peter Pearson – July 1985 to October 1987
Judith McCann – October to December 1987, acting executive director
Michèle Fortin – December 1987 to May 1988, acting executive director
Pierre DesRoches – June 1988 to June 1994
Peter Katadotis – June 1994 to March 1995, acting executive director
François Macerola – March 1995 to November 1998
Peter Katadotis – November to December 1998, acting executive director
François Macerola – January 1999 to July 2001
Johanne St-Arnauld – July 2001 to January 2002, acting executive director
Richard Stursberg – January 2002 to July 2004
Carolle Brabant – July 2004 to January 2005, acting executive director
Wayne Clarkson – January 2005 to January 2010
Carolle Brabant – March 2010 to March 2018
Jean-Claude Mahé – March to July 2018, acting executive director
Christa Dickenson – July 2018 to present

Chairpersons of the board
Georges-Émile Lapalme – February 1968 to November 1969
Gratien Gélinas – November 1969 to February 1978
Michel Vennat – March 1978 to May 1981
David Silcox – September 1981 to December 1982
Claude Morin – January to March 1983, chaired board meetings as vice-chair
Ed Prévost – April 1983 to June 1986
Jean Sirois – July 1987 to April 1988
Edmund C. Bovey – May 1988 to April 1990
Harvey Corn – July 1990 to June 1993
André Provost – June to July 1993, acting chair
Robert Dinan – July 1993 to July 1998
Laurier LaPierre – July 1998 to July 2001
François Macerola – July 2001 to February 2002
Charles Bélanger – February 2002 to February 2007
Felix (Fil) Fraser – February to October 2007, interim chair
Michel Roy – October 2007 to present

Regional agencies

Provincial
Alberta Media Fund (Alberta)
Creative BC Film Commission (British Columbia)
Manitoba Film & Music (Manitoba)
Department of Tourism, Heritage and Culture (New Brunswick)
Newfoundland and Labrador Film Development Corporation (Newfoundland and Labrador)
Screen Nova Scotia (Nova Scotia)
Ontario Media Development Corporation (Ontario Creates)
Northern Ontario Heritage Fund (Northern Ontario)
Prince Edward Island Film Production Fund
Société de développement des entreprises culturelles (Quebec)
Creative Saskatchewan

Territorial
NWT Film Commission (Northwest Territories)
Nunavut Film Development Corporation (Nunavut)
Yukon Media Development (Yukon)

See also
Cinema of Canada
Cinema of Quebec

References

External links

Telefilm Canada: History
CBC Digital Archives - Bright Lights, Political Fights: The Canadian Film Industry

Federal departments and agencies of Canada
Department of Canadian Heritage
Canadian federal Crown corporations
Film organizations in Canada
Organizations based in Montreal
1967 establishments in Canada
Film production companies of Canada